Gypsy Breynton is the heroine of an eponymous series of books written by Elizabeth Stuart Phelps. 

The books were written in 1866–67 for Sunday schools and so are of an improving nature. Gypsy, as the name indicates, is an impetuous tomboy who lives a chaotic life lacking a system. Her development and experiences provide the basis for the restrained moralizing of the stories.

The four books in the series are

 Gypsy Breynton
 Gypsy's Cousin Joy
 Gypsy's Sowing and Reaping
 Gypsy's Year at the Golden Crescent

Gypsy Benton was part of an era introducing tomboyism in American literature. Around this same period, several other similar characters were created, including those in Little Women (1868) by Louisa May Alcott and What Katy Did (1872) by Sarah Chauncey Woolsey.

References

External links
 Gypsy Breynton at Project Gutenberg

1866 American novels
Novels set during the American Civil War
American children's novels
Series of children's books
Breynton, Gypsy
1860s children's books
1867 American novels